Joseph Benhard (born 10 May 1972) is a Namibian boxer. Bernhard competed for Namibia at the 1996 Summer Olympics. Fighting as a light flyweight, Benhard lost to Spaniard Rafael Lozano in the first round. He also represented Namibia at the 1994 Commonwealth Games.

Benhard turned professional in 2004 but lost the light weight challenge in 2005 to Simon Negodhi. He then tried to make a comeback but his age wouldn’t allow it. Nicknamed "Fimbi Kaliwa", he is still undefeated in his amateur boxing career. He founded the Kilimanjaro Boxing club in March 2007.

Professional boxing record

References

External links

External links

1972 births
Living people
Light-flyweight boxers
Boxers at the 1996 Summer Olympics
Olympic boxers of Namibia
Boxers at the 1994 Commonwealth Games
Commonwealth Games competitors for Namibia
Namibian male boxers